Grand Hyatt Taipei is a 5-star luxury hotel in Taipei, Taiwan. Located in Xinyi Planning District, the 27-story,  skyscraper hotel is located adjacent to Taipei 101, Taipei World Trade Center complex, Taipei City Council, Taipei International Convention Center, and various shopping malls and entertainment. It opened in 1990 as "the first, true international luxury hotel in the capital." The hotel is owned by Hong Leong Group and operated by Hyatt Hotels Corporation.

Accommodation
Grand Hyatt Taipei has 850 rooms and suites, the largest number of guest rooms in the country. Guestrooms and suites range from 31 sq m to 220 sq m, and offer city, mountain or poolside views.

Notable guests

 Air Supply 
 Andrea Bocelli  
 Avril Lavigne 
 B1A4  - South Korean band 
 Backstreet Boys 
 Beyoncé 
 Bill Clinton - The 42nd President of the United States  
 Boyz II Men  
 Bradley Beal - NBA player  
 Chen Yunlin - former chairman of the Association for Relations Across the Taiwan Straits (ARATS), 
 Damian Lillard - NBA player 
 Diane Kruger
 Eagles  
 Europe
 FTIsland - South Korean band 
 George H. W. Bush - The 41st President of the United States  
 Guns N' Roses  
 Hidetoshi Nakata - former Japanese football player  
 Hugh Jackman 
 Imagine Dragons  
 Jo In-sung - South Korean actor 
 Kenny G - American saxophonist 
 Lee Dong-wook - South Korean actor 
 Lee Min-ho  - South Korean actor 
 Linkin Park 
 Margaret Thatcher - former Prime Minister of United Kingdom 
 Mr. Big 
 Mswati III - the King of Eswatini 
 Namie Amuro - Japanese singer and actress  
 Nancy Pelosi   - Speaker of the United States House of Representatives
 Nicolas Cage  
 Nigel Kennedy - British violinist 
 Robinson Canó - MLB player  
 Snoop Dogg  
 Song Hye-kyo - South Korean actress 
 SS501 - South Korean boy band 
 Thirty Seconds to Mars  
 Wonder Girls  - South Korean girl group 
 X Japan - Japanese heavy metal band

References

External links

 Grand Hyatt Taipei

1990 establishments in Taiwan
Hotel buildings completed in 1989
Hotels established in 1990
Skyscraper hotels in Taipei
Hyatt Hotels and Resorts
Xinyi Special District